Fyska, Greek (Φύσκα) is a village in the prefecture of Kilkis. In the census of 2001 Fyska had 289 inhabitants.

History
Most inhabitants moved from Fyska to cities like Kilkis or Thessaloniki during the mid 20th century. The village used to have some 1000 inhabitants. The village was created during the time of the Pontian genocide in Turkey (also known as the  Ottoman Empire) during the 1920s when many Pontians fled Turkey to settle in Greece.

The old name of the village is Planitsa; the village was renamed in February 1926.

Industry 
Residents of Fyska are mainly engaged in agriculture and animal husbandry. The main crops are wheat farmers and tobacco.

Football team 
Fyska has a football team called Irakli Fyskas, Greek (Ηρακλή Φύσκας).

External links 
 Νέα χρονιά και προσδοκίες για τον Ηρακλή Φύσκας 

Villages in Greece